The discography of the Ivorian reggae artist Alpha Blondy consists of fifteen studio albums, two live albums, eight compilation albums, and sixteen singles.

Albums

Studio albums

Live albums

Compilation albums

Singles

Music videos

References 

Blondy, Alpha
Blondy, Alpha